George Wilkinson Stewart (17 September 1882 – 5 December 1966) was an Australian rules footballer who played with Carlton in the Victorian Football League (VFL).

Notes

External links 

George Stewart's profile at Blueseum

1882 births
1966 deaths
VFL/AFL players born outside Australia
Australian rules footballers from Victoria (Australia)
Carlton Football Club players
Eaglehawk Football Club players
Scottish players of Australian rules football
Sportspeople from Glasgow
People from Anderston
Scottish emigrants to Australia